Henry Young was the first  Deputy Governor of the Bombay Presidency from 1668 to 13 November 1669  after capture from the Dutch. Concurrent with the term of Sir George Oxenden, his term oversaw the establishment of Bombay and the arrival of is first urban residents.

References

Year of birth missing
Year of death missing
Deputy Governors of Bombay